"Hole in My Heart" is a song recorded by American country music group Blackhawk.  It was released in June 1997 as first single from the album Love & Gravity.  The song reached #31 on the Billboard Hot Country Singles & Tracks chart.  The song was written by group members Van Stephenson and Dave Robbins, along with Desmond Child.

Chart performance

References

1997 singles
1997 songs
Blackhawk (band) songs
Songs written by Desmond Child
Songs written by Dave Robbins (keyboardist)
Songs written by Van Stephenson
Song recordings produced by Mark Bright (record producer)
Arista Nashville singles